USS Herald of the Morning was a C2-S-B1 Maritime Commission hull that served in heavy combat in the Pacific Theatre during World War II as a merchant and United States Navy vessel.

Ship history 
She was delivered on 30 November 1943, to the United States Lines, under contract to the War Shipping Administration (WSA). The ship made one trip to the Hawaiian Islands as a merchant cargo vessel before being taken over early in 1944 by the Navy for conversion into an auxiliary transport. The ship was converted for Navy service at United Engineering Company in Alameda, California. From then on, she was designated AP-173.

U.S. Navy service 
After a brief shakedown cruise, the ship loaded troops and supplies and sailed for the Hawaiian Islands on 2 May 1944. Arriving six days later, Herald of the Morning engaged in amphibious training exercises for the upcoming invasion of the Marianas an important step in the historic island hopping campaign toward Japan. The ships departed for the Marshalls on 1 June. Herald of the Morning was assigned to a reserve group, and arrived at Saipan on 16 June, the day after Vice Admiral Turner's Marines had landed. The transport unloaded her supplies, debarked troops, and retired to Eniwetok on 26 June. There she remained from 1–13 July before sailing back to Pearl Harbor to load more troops for the Pacific Sighting.  Following World War II, Herald of the Morning was assigned to occupation service in the Far East. She was decommissioned from naval service on 9 August 1946, and was subsequently placed in the National Defense Reserve Fleet.

Merchant Service 
In 1948, the ship was sold to Waterman Steamship Company, sailing as SS Citrus Packer. In 1950, two crewman of Citrus Packer were killed by a North Korean sniper ambush. The report stated that the two men left the ship when it docked in Inchon on 1 October and were never seen again. Four days later, when the ship sailed, the two were reported missing to U.S. Army authorities. When the vessel arrived in Yokohama the skipper was notified that their bodies had been found. She sailed as Citrus Packer until 1958, when she was sold to Gulf-South American Steamship Company as SS Gulf Trader.

Fate 
As of 30 July 1969, the ship was reported as "unseaworthy" according to a U.S. Fifth Circuit Court of Appeals case, in which a longshoreman was injured while loading and storing cargo. He was awarded $75,000 in damages. She was scrapped in 1973.

Ship Awards 
Herald of the Morning received five battle stars for World War II service.

References 

Ships of the United States Navy